Malleco Formation is a geological formation of volcanic origin in the Andes of Araucanía Region (38–39° S), Chile. The formation is made up by volcaniclastic rocks, including tuffs, lahars and lavas of Pliocene–Early Pleistocene age. It is considered equivalent to the Cola de Zorro Formation found further north in Chile and the so-called "Asociación volcánica de la precordillera oriental" located around the upper courses Bío Bío and Aluminé rivers.

References 

Geologic formations of Chile
Pliocene Series of South America
Neogene Chile
Pleistocene Chile
Geology of Araucanía Region